Taras Hryhoriyovych Danko (Тарас Григорійович Данько; born July 3, 1980 in Kiev, in the Ukrainian SSR of the Soviet Union) is a Ukrainian wrestler, who has won a bronze medal at the 2008 Summer Olympics.

References
Taras Danko's profile at ESPN
sports-reference

External links
 

Olympic wrestlers of Ukraine
Wrestlers at the 2004 Summer Olympics
Wrestlers at the 2008 Summer Olympics
Olympic bronze medalists for Ukraine
1980 births
Living people
Sportspeople from Kyiv
Olympic medalists in wrestling
Medalists at the 2008 Summer Olympics
World Wrestling Championships medalists
Ukrainian male sport wrestlers